The Gardens of Murcia may refer to:

 The Gardens of Murcia (1923 film), a French silent film
 The Gardens of Murcia (1936 film), a French drama film